José Francesch (18 August 1908 – 22 August 1964) was a Spanish swimmer. He competed in the men's 200 metre breaststroke event at the 1928 Summer Olympics.

References

External links
 

1908 births
1964 deaths
Olympic swimmers of Spain
Swimmers at the 1928 Summer Olympics
Swimmers from Barcelona
Spanish male breaststroke swimmers
20th-century Spanish people